Stewartsville is a city in southwest DeKalb County, Missouri, United States. The population was 733 at the 2020 census. The community is named for Robert M. Stewart, a former Missouri governor. It is part of the St. Joseph, MO–KS Metropolitan Statistical Area.

History
Stewartsville was originally called Tethertown, and under the latter name was platted in 1854 by George Tetherow, and named for him. A post office called Stewartsville has been in operation since 1855.

The Dalton-Uphoff House was listed on the National Register of Historic Places in 1982.

Geography 
Stewartsville is located at 39°45'9" North, 94°29'55" West (39.752627, -94.498624).  	 		 

Stewartsville is located adjacent to U.S. Route 36.

Demographics

2010 census
As of the census of 2010, there were 750 people, 298 households, and 209 families residing in the city. The racial makeup of the city was 96.8% White, 0.5% African American, 0.1% Native American, 0.1% Pacific Islander, 0.8% from other races, and 1.6% from two or more races. Hispanic or Latino of any race were 2.0% of the population.

There were 298 households, of which 30.5% had children under the age of 18 living with them, 51.0% were married couples living together, 12.8% had a female householder with no husband present, 6.4% had a male householder with no wife present, and 29.9% were non-families. 24.2% of all households were made up of individuals, and 10.1% had someone living alone who was 65 years of age or older. The average household size was 2.52 and the average family size was 2.98.

The median age in the city was 40.1 years. 23.1% of residents were under the age of 18; 9.9% were between the ages of 18 and 24; 23.8% were from 25 to 44; 28.2% were from 45 to 64; and 14.8% were 65 years of age or older. The gender makeup of the city was 48.9% male and 51.1% female.

2000 census
As of the census of 2000, there were 759 people, 288 households, and 211 families residing in the city.  The population density was 779.5 people per square mile (302.1/km).  There were 308 housing units at an average density of 316.3 per square mile (122.6/km).  The racial makeup of the city was 96.84% White, 1.58% African American, 0.13% Native American, 0.13% Asian, 0.26% from other races, and 1.05% from two or more races. Hispanic or Latino of any race were 1.19% of the population.

There were 288 households, out of which 35.8% had children under the age of 18 living with them, 57.6% were married couples living together, 9.7% had a female householder with no husband present, and 26.7% were non-families. 24.3% of all households were made up of individuals, and 14.2% had someone living alone who was 65 years of age or older.  The average household size was 2.64 and the average family size was 3.12.

In the city the population was spread out, with 27.8% under the age of 18, 8.4% from 18 to 24, 29.4% from 25 to 44, 18.7% from 45 to 64, and 15.7% who were 65 years of age or older.  The median age was 36 years. For every 100 females, there were 89.3 males.  For every 100 females age 18 and over, there were 87.7 males.

The median income for a household in the city was $35,063, and the median income for a family was $40,789. Males had a median income of $31,563 versus $19,917 for females. The per capita income for the city was $14,509.  About 7.4% of families and 7.6% of the population were below the poverty line, including 4.6% of those under age 18 and 19.6% of those age 65 or over.

Gallery

References

External links
 Historic maps of Stewartsville in the Sanborn Maps of Missouri Collection at the University of Missouri

Cities in DeKalb County, Missouri
St. Joseph, Missouri metropolitan area
Cities in Missouri